Bennie T. Charleston (April 29, 1907 – February 29, 1988), nicknamed "Tweed", was an American Negro league pitcher in the 1930s.

A native of Indianapolis, Indiana, Charleston was the brother of Baseball Hall of Famer Oscar Charleston. He played for the Pittsburgh Crawfords alongside his brother in 1932. Charleston died in Indianapolis in 1988 at age 80.

References

External links
 and Baseball-Reference Black Baseball Stats and Seamheads

1907 births
1988 deaths
Pittsburgh Crawfords players
20th-century African-American sportspeople